Shorinji Kempo was one of 44 sports and disciplines featured at the 2011 Southeast Asian Games.

Medal summary

Embu

Men

Women

Mixed

Randori

Men

Women

Medal table

External links
  2011 Southeast Asian Games
 Indonesia Fights Doping on the Home Front
 Atlet Malaysia di SEA Games XXVI Pakai Doping

2011 Southeast Asian Games events
Shorinji Kempo at the Southeast Asian Games